WPSO (1500 AM) is a radio station broadcasting a Greek variety format. It is licensed to New Port Richey, Florida, United States, and is owned by Angelatos Broadcasting.

The station signed on in 1963 as WGUL. After that station relocated in 1985 to 860 AM, the call letters were changed to WPSO. The station began broadcasting in Greek in 1992.

External links

PSO
PSO
Greek-American culture in Florida
1963 establishments in Florida
Radio stations established in 1963
Tarpon Springs, Florida
PSO